Greg Halder (born December 5, 1955) is a Canadian former professional tennis player.

Born and raised in Toronto, Halder is the son of ice hockey player Wally Halder, who was a member of the gold medal-winning team at the 1948 Winter Olympics. He turned professional in 1974. At the 1977 Volvo International in North Conway he had an upset win over world number five Raul Ramirez. In 1978 he featured in the singles main draws of the Wimbledon Championships and US Open. He represented Canada in two Davis Cup ties during his career.

See also
List of Canada Davis Cup team representatives

References

External links
 
 
 

1955 births
Living people
Canadian male tennis players
Tennis players from Toronto